Ilona Szatmári Waldau (born 1962) is a Swedish politician.  she serves as Member of the Riksdag representing the constituency of Uppsala County. She was also elected as Member of the Riksdag in September 2022. She is affiliated with the Left Party.

References 

Living people
1962 births
Place of birth missing (living people)
21st-century Swedish politicians
21st-century Swedish women politicians
Members of the Riksdag 2018–2022
Members of the Riksdag 2022–2026
Members of the Riksdag from the Left Party (Sweden)
Women members of the Riksdag